Stéphane Louis André Dumas (14 September 1978) is a French basketball coach and former player who played as a point guard. He is currently the assistant basketball coach for Gran Canaria of the Liga ACB, alongside Spaniard Alejandro Paniagua, the current coach of the Equatorial Guinea national team.

Professional playing career
After winning three competitions with CSP Limoges, Dumas arrives to Spain and signs with Joventut Badalona, where he plays two years. team who was runner-up of the Copa del Rey. After playing in Badalona he plays between 2002 and 2003 in Fórum Valladolid and Caprabo Lleida.

The next year comes back to Joventut Badalona, where he is runner-up of the Copa del Rey.

In 2006, he signs with Baloncesto León of LEB League, Spanish second division, and he plays two years. In the first one, León losses in the semifinals of the promotion playoffs and in the second, wins the Copa Príncipe and promotes to Liga ACB as runner-up.

In 2008, Dumas signs with CB Lucentum Alicante and finishes runner-up of Copa Príncipe. In the LEB Oro League, Lucentum losses in the semifinals of promotion playoffs against Tenerife Rural.

For the 2008–09, Stéphane Dumas comes back to CB Valladolid and he clinches the title of the LEB Oro League, promoting to Liga ACB. In the next season he renews his contract with castilian team.

Two years later, and after playing a Copa del Rey, Dumas renews again his contract.

In summer 2012, Dumas leaves Valladolid and comes back to France.

Coaching career
In summer 2019 he became the head coach of Equatorial Guinea. 

On July 22, 2020, he became assistant coach for Gran Canaria of the Liga ACB.

Achievements
Ligue Nationale de Basketball: (1) 1999–2000
Coupe de France: (1) 1999–2000
Korać Cup: (1) 1999-2000
Copa Príncipe: (1) 2007
LEB Oro: (1) 2008–09

References

External links 
 Stéphane Dumas at ACB.com
 Stéphane Dumas at FEB.es

1978 births
Living people
CB Girona players
CB Lucentum Alicante players
CB Valladolid players
French basketball coaches
French expatriate basketball people in Spain
French men's basketball players
HTV Basket players
JL Bourg-en-Bresse players
Joventut Badalona players
Liga ACB players
Limoges CSP players
Point guards
S.S. Felice Scandone players
Sportspeople from Var (department)